Kiong Nai (or Jiongnai) is a divergent Hmongic (Miao) language spoken in Jinxiu County, Guangxi, China. Mao & Li (2002) believe it to be most closely related to She.

Dialects
Mao & Li (2002) divide Jiongnai into two major dialects.
Longhua (龙华), spoken in Longhua (龙华村) of Changdong Township (长垌乡)
Liuxiang (六巷), spoken in Liuxiang Township (六巷乡)

Jiongnai is spoken in the following villages in three townships of Jinxiu Yao Autonomous County, Guangxi.
Liuxiang Township (六巷乡): Liuxiang (六巷), Mengtou (门头), Dadeng (大凳), Huangsang (黄桑), Xincun (新村), and Gupu (古蒲)
Changdong Township (长垌乡): Longhua (龙华), Nanzhou (南州), and Dajing (大进)
Luoxiang Township (罗香乡): Zhanger (丈二), Liutuan (六团), and Luodan (罗丹)

References

Sources

External links
 Longhua and Liuxiang Jiongnai basic lexicon at the Global Lexicostatistical Database

Hmongic languages
Languages of China